A Treasure in My Garden (original French-language title: Un trésor dans mon jardin) is a Canadian series of songs and accompanying animated shorts created by Gilles Vigneault. The animated series was produced with the participation of Teletoon/Télétoon in both English and French, and was first shown in September 2003 on both channels.

Episodes
An additional song, Un soir d'hiver, is present on the French-language audio CD but not the English-language one, and does not appear to have a corresponding animated short.

References

Teletoon original programming
2000s Canadian animated television series
2003 Canadian television series debuts
2003 Canadian television series endings
Canadian children's animated musical television series